"Lie to Me" is the seventh episode of the second season of Buffy the Vampire Slayer. It originally aired on November 3, 1997.

Plot
In an empty playground at night, Drusilla attempts to coax a young boy into being sired as a vampire until Angel intervenes and sends the boy home. Angel then tries to persuade Drusilla to leave Sunnydale with Spike, warning that this will end badly for everyone; Drusilla refuses, saying it is "just the beginning". Buffy watches the encounter from a rooftop, clearly unsettled.

As Buffy talks with Willow and Xander in the school hallway about the incident the next day, her friend Ford (Billy Fordham), with whom she attended school in Los Angeles, surprises her, explaining that he has transferred to Sunnydale High to finish his senior year. At the Bronze, Ford entertains Willow and Xander with embarrassing stories about Buffy. Buffy introduces Angel to Ford, whom Angel becomes suspicious of. In the alley behind the Bronze, Ford sees Buffy stake a vampire; he reveals that he already knows that she is the Slayer, having found out shortly before she was expelled from their previous school. Angel shows up at Willow's bedroom to ask for help tracking down Ford on the internet. Willow quickly finds that Ford is not actually registered at Sunnydale High.

The next night, Buffy and Ford see two vampires running onto campus. Out of sight of Buffy, Ford holds a stake to a female blonde vampire's heart and threatens to kill her unless she does what he wants. When Buffy finds Ford again he claims to have killed the vampire. Meanwhile, Xander, Willow and Angel visit the Sunset Club, the only address Willow has found for Ford. The patrons romanticize and sympathize vampires, whom they refer to as "the Lonely Ones", much to Angel's derision.

Buffy goes back to the library and meets Giles and Jenny Calendar. Buffy sees a picture of Drusilla among Giles' research. Giles explains that she was Spike's lover, supposedly killed by an angry mob in Prague, but Buffy tells him that she is still alive and that she saw her with Angel. Soon, the blonde female vampire storms out of Giles' study with a book. Buffy recognizes her as the vampire Ford said he had killed. Ford approaches a reluctant Spike and asks to be made a vampire, offering to give them the Slayer in return.

Later that night, Angel comes to Buffy's house to tell her about Ford's club. As Buffy is upset that her friends went behind her back to find out about Ford, she professes her love for Angel but says she does not know if she can trust him, and asks him to tell her the truth about Drusilla. Angel admits  to a stunned Buffy that he had been obsessed with Drusilla, once a sweet young woman, and tortured her and killed her family until he sired her; turning her into an insane demon.

Buffy goes to the Sunset Club where Ford explains that he was counting on Buffy figuring out his plan. Buffy pleads with him to let the other club members go. Ford tells her that he has brain cancer with only six months to live; becoming a vampire is the only way he can avoid death. He then admits to her that the other people will not be changed.

Within minutes of sunset, the vampires arrive and immediately begin feeding. Ford attacks Buffy, but she knocks him out. Buffy overpowers Drusilla and threatens to stake her. Spike immediately orders the vampires to stop feeding. Buffy demands that they let everyone go, which Spike agrees to. The former vampire worshippers flee and Buffy follows. Ford is still unconscious on the floor as Buffy closes the door, locking all the vampires inside with him. Ford awakens and, since he held up his end of the bargain by luring the Slayer, demands that Spike holds up his end of the bargain and sire him. Shrugging off this latest defeat, Spike does so.

A few nights later Buffy and Giles are waiting over Ford's grave. Ford's vampire self emerges and Buffy stakes her former friend, before wondering sadly if life for her as a Slayer ever gets easier.

Reception
"Lie to Me" had an audience of 3.4 million households on its original airing.

References

External links

 

1997 American television episodes
Buffy the Vampire Slayer (season 2) episodes
Television episodes written by Joss Whedon
Television episodes directed by Joss Whedon